Liberty School may refer to:

Liberty School (Blue Hill, Maine)
Liberty School No. 4, Friendship Building, Pittsburgh, Pennsylvania
The Liberty School, a school in Shadyside, Pittsburgh, Pennsylvania
Liberty Colored High School Liberty, South Carolina
Liberty School (Brentwood, Tennessee)

See also
Liberty Hill School (disambiguation)
Liberty High School (disambiguation)
Liberty Middle School (disambiguation)
Liberty School Cafeteria, Hamlet, Arkansas
New Liberty School (disambiguation)